is a former Japanese football player.

Club statistics

References

External links

sports.geocities.jp

1986 births
Living people
Association football people from Osaka Prefecture
People from Yao, Osaka
Japanese footballers
J1 League players
J2 League players
Japan Football League players
Kyoto Sanga FC players
Fagiano Okayama players
Association football midfielders